Lt Gen Richard Thomas Glyn  (23 December 1831 – 21 November 1900) was a British Army officer. He joined the 82nd Regiment of Foot (Prince of Wales's Volunteers) by purchasing an ensign's commission in 1850. Glyn served with the regiment in the Crimean War and rose in rank to captain before transferring to the 24th (The 2nd Warwickshire) Regiment of Foot in 1856.  He served with that regiment in the Indian Mutiny and was appointed to command it in 1872. In 1875 he accompanied the 1st battalion of the regiment on service in the Cape Colony and fought with them in the 9th Cape Frontier War of 1877–78. He was appointed a Companion of the Order of the Bath after the war.

Glyn commanded No. 3 Column, including men from both battalions of his regiment, during the first British invasion of Zululand in 1879. Whilst Glyn was accompanying Lieutenant-General Lord Chelmsford on a reconnaissance, the column's camp was attacked and almost wiped out in the Battle of Isandlwana. Glyn commanded the post at Rorke's Drift in the aftermath of the Battle of Rorke's Drift. Though suffering from depression and a mental breakdown he made orders to recover the missing Queen's Colour of the 1st Battalion and to bury the bodies of his men. He was excluded from a court of enquiry held by Chelmsford into the defeat at Isandlwana and survived an attempt by Chelmsford's staff to blame him for the disaster.

Glyn commanded a brigade in the successful second invasion of Zululand that brought the war to the close. He returned to the United Kingdom after the war to command the regimental depot at Brecon, Wales, and superintended the change of the 24th Regiment into the South Wales Borderers. Glyn was appointed Companion of the Order of St Michael and St George for his service in the Zulu War. He was promoted to general rank before his retirement, after which he served in the ceremonial role of colonel of the regiment of the South Wales Borderers until his death.

Early career 
Glyn was born in 1831. He joined the 82nd Regiment of Foot (Prince of Wales's Volunteers) as an ensign by purchasing a commission on 16 August 1850. Glyn received promotion to lieutenant, by purchase, on 24 June 1853. He served with the regiment in the Crimean War from 1855 to 1856. Vacancies in the field could be filled without purchase and Glyn was promoted in this manner to the rank of captain on 7 September 1855. For his service in the Crimea he received the Crimea Medal, with a clasp indicating service at the Siege of Sevastopol, and the Ottoman Empire's Turkish Crimea Medal.

Glyn transferred to the 24th (The 2nd Warwickshire) Regiment of Foot on 30 September 1856. Glyn served with the regiment during the Indian Mutiny, from 1857 to 1858, and received the Indian Mutiny Medal. He was promoted to the rank of major by purchase on 23 July 1861 and to lieutenant colonel, also by purchase, on 13 February 1867.   Glyn received command of the 24th Regiment in February 1872 and on the 13th of that month was granted the brevet rank of colonel.

Southern Africa 
The 1st Battalion of the 24th Regiment was posted to the Cape Colony in Southern Africa in 1875 and Glyn accompanied them. The battalion served in the 9th Cape Frontier War of 1877–78, during which Glyn commanded the British troops in Transkei against the Xhosa people. After the conclusion of the war Glyn was appointed a Companion of the Order of the Bath. Historian Donald Morris described Glyn as "a short, grouchy officer" who frequently fell out with his subordinates.

The 2nd Battalion of the 24th Regiment was posted to the Cape to join the 1st Battalion in preparation for the 1879 Zulu War. At this point Glyn was the second-most-senior British officer in Southern Africa, after Frederic Thesiger, 2nd Baron Chelmsford, who commanded British forces in the war. Chelmsford gave Glyn command of his No. 3 Column, the principal British invading force, but allowed him little independence of command, as Chelmsford accompanied the column in the invasion of Zululand. Glyn commanded the troops in the opening action of the war, at Sihayo's Kraal on 12 January 1879.

No. 3 Column afterwards advanced to the mountain of Isandlwana on a slow march towards the Zulu capital, Ulundi.  Glyn accompanied Chelmsford on a reconnaissance in force to Mangeni on the morning of 22 January, leaving the 1st Battalion's Lieutenant-Colonel Henry Pulleine in command of the camp.  Pulleine was later joined by the more senior Colonel Anthony Durnford, with additional troops.  During Glyn's absence, a large Zulu force attacked the camp, wiping out the command and killing Pulleine and Durnford in the Battle of Isandlwana. Glyn and Chelmsford's force passed through the battlefield later that day on the way to Rorke's Drift, where a small British garrison had successfully fought off a Zulu attack.

Glyn's post-battle report on Isandlwana was emotional and, because there were so few British survivors, is based partly on his own speculation. It was written, in part, as an attempt to vindicate the actions of his officers in the battle. It was the first official record of the actions of Lieutenants Teignmouth Melvill and Nevill Coghill, who had made a fatal attempt to save the Queen's Colour of the 1st Battalion of the 24th Regiment. This colour had been received by Glyn as a young officer on parade at Curragh Camp in 1866 from the Countess of Kimberley (wife of John Wodehouse, 1st Earl of Kimberley). After reading a report on the event from eyewitness Lieutenant Walter Higginson of the Natal Native Contingent, Glyn ordered a party to Isandlwana to bury the bodies of Melvill and Coghill and then a second party to attempt to recover the remains of the colour. The damaged colour was retrieved and later repaired by Glyn's wife Anne; it remained in use by the regiment until 1933.

Glyn was left in command at Rorke's Drift by Chelmsford. He led a demoralised force, isolated from any immediate assistance and in fear of an imminent second Zulu attack. Rainy conditions and the outbreak of disease did not help matters, nor his orders that confined most of the garrison to the interior of the post. Glyn arranged the strengthening of the post into Fort Bromhead and, later, established a new fort near the Buffalo River, Fort Melvill.  His command was dysfunctional due to Glyn suffering from depression; he suffered a mental breakdown, but recovered. Despite parties from other units recovering wagons and burying bodies at Isandlwana, Glyn requested their commanders not touch his men, whom he wanted buried by their comrades.  Surviving detachments from the regiment began this work, which took several months, on 20 June.

Glyn was not called as a witness to Chelmsford's court of enquiry following Isandlwana. The court served principally as a means of exonerating Chelmsford and blaming Durnford for the defeat. Glyn's posting to Rorke's Drift served as a means of isolating him from the enquiry. Chelmsford's staff attempted to deflect criticism from their commander onto Glyn and sent him requests to account for his interpretation of Chelmsford's orders relating to the camp at Isandlwana. Glyn maintained a general silence on the matter, noting that Chelmsford knew better than him what his orders were and that it was his duty to carry them out. Glyn's wife was indignant at his treatment and robustly defended him, which forced Chelmsford's staff to cease this line of action.

In the victorious second invasion of Zululand from May 1879, Glyn commanded the 1st Brigade of the 2nd Division. He commanded the infantry brigade at the Battle of Ulundi, which sealed the British victory in the war.

Later career 
After the Zulu War Glyn returned to the United Kingdom to command the 24th Regimental District and the regiment's depot at Brecon, Wales.  He spent a period on retirement half pay from 19 May 1880. Glyn was appointed a Companion of the Order of St Michael and St George on 30 October 1880 for his services in the Zulu War. Glyn superintended the change of his regiment's name from the 24th Regiment of Foot to the South Wales Borderers under the 1881 Childers Reforms.

Glyn was promoted to major-general on 30 September 1882. His appointment as commander of the South Wales Borderers' regimental district ended on 6 December 1882. He was promoted to the honorary rank of lieutenant-general shortly before his retirement on 30 September 1887. Glyn was appointed to the ceremonial role of colonel of the regiment of the South Wales Borderers on 29 May 1898.

Death and legacy 
Glyn died at his home, Chequers, in Stratfield Saye, Hampshire, on 21 November 1900, not long after witnessing his regiment return to Southern Africa for service in the Second Boer War. He is buried in his family's plot at Ewell, Surrey. A hoof from his horse, Yellow Rose, serves as an ash tray in the officers' dining room of the Royal Regiment of Wales, the successor of the South Wales Borderers.

References 

1831 births
1900 deaths
British Army lieutenant generals
Companions of the Order of the Bath
Companions of the Order of St Michael and St George
British Army personnel of the Crimean War
British military personnel of the Indian Rebellion of 1857
British Army personnel of the Anglo-Zulu War